The Game Awards 2021 was an award show that honored the best video games of 2021. The event was hosted by Geoff Keighley, creator and producer of The Game Awards, and was held to an invited audience at the Microsoft Theater in Los Angeles on December 9, 2021. The preshow ceremony was hosted by Sydnee Goodman. The event was live streamed across more than 40 digital platforms. It featured musical performances from Imagine Dragons, JID, Darren Korb, and Sting, and presentations from celebrity guests including Reggie Fils-Aimé, Keanu Reeves, Ben Schwartz, and Ming-Na Wen. Activision Blizzard was excluded from the show outside of its nominated games after the company was sued by the California Department of Fair Employment and Housing on allegations of sexual harassment and employee discrimination in July 2021; Keighley's comments about the company received some criticism.

Deathloop led the show with nine nominations; it won Best Game Direction and Best Art Direction. Forza Horizon 5 and It Takes Two tied for the most wins with three awards, and the latter won Game of the Year. Marvel's Guardians of the Galaxy was awarded Best Narrative, and Maggie Robertson won Best Performance for her role as Lady Dimitrescu in Resident Evil Village. Several new games were announced during the show, including Alan Wake II, The Expanse: A Telltale Series, and Sonic Frontiers, and the first full trailers for Halo and Sonic the Hedgehog 2 premiered. The show was viewed by over 85 million streams, the most in its history to date. It received mixed reviews, with some praise directed at new game announcements and criticism for its length and focus on announcements over awards.

Background 

As with previous iterations of The Game Awards, the show was hosted and produced by Canadian games journalist Geoff Keighley; the 30-minute preshow was hosted by Sydnee Goodman. Following the success of The Game Awards 2020—which was broadcast virtually due to the COVID-19 pandemic—Keighley received suggestions to follow the same format; around mid-2021, he decided the show would return to an in-person event at the Microsoft Theater in Los Angeles as he "really missed the energy of people accepting their awards live and the reactions". Several safety protocols were put in place, including halving live attendance, mandating vaccines, and requiring face masks; contingency plans were also established in case of unexpected COVID-19 variants or other issues. Keighley noted an excitement to return to the in-person event, stating it was the first time in two years the industry was able to gather.

The Game Awards partnered with Spotify to produce a four-episode podcast titled Inside the Game Awards, hosted by Keighley and featuring IGN Tina Amini, Giant Bomb Jeff Gerstmann, and The Guardian Keza MacDonald; it was released weekly from November 22, 2021, with episodes focusing on the history of the show and musical performances, the 2021 nominees, and a post-show recap. The Game Awards 2021 was the second show to feature Future Class, a list of individuals from across the video game industry who best represent the future of video games; the inductees included industry professionals such as Capybara Games producer Farah Coculuzzi, Xbox social marketing manager Hailey Geller, Gayming Magazine editor-in-chief Aimee Hart, disability rights activist Amy Kavanagh, and Deck Nine Games narrative director Felice Kuan.

The show was executive produced by Keighley and Kimmie Kim, with LeRoy Bennett serving as creative director and Richard Preuss as director. The presentation was aired on December 9, 2021, live streamed across more than 40 online platforms. ​The show partnered with Nodwin Gaming for distribution in India, where it was broadcast on platforms such as Disney+, Jio TV, MTV India, MX Player, and Voot. It was available to watch in the interactive environment of Axial Tilt, built within the video game Core; players could interact with the red carpet before the event and a virtual party after it. Several days before the show, Alice O'Connor of Rock, Paper, Shotgun described the experience as "dead boring", which she said "seems perfectly fitting" for The Game Awards.

Relationship with Activision Blizzard 
Keighley said he was reevaluating the show's relationship with Activision Blizzard after the company was sued by the California Department of Fair Employment and Housing on allegations of sexual harassment and employee discrimination in July 2021, adding he wanted the show to support employees and developers without diminishing individual achievements; Kotaku Ethan Gach characterized Keighley's statement as a refusal to "take sides", and noted the show's advisory board included Activision president Rob Kostich. After some criticism, Keighley stated Activision Blizzard would not be part of the ceremony outside of its nominated games, and wrote the show was committed to "work together to build a better and a more inclusive environment".

Before the event, some Activision Blizzard employees and supporters stood outside the Microsoft Theater in protest of the company's recent laying off of around 20 workers at subsidiary company Raven Software. Early in the show, Keighley denounced abuse in the industry; Kotaku Gach criticized Keighley's statement, noting he did not refer to Activision Blizzard by name and his statement failed to "meaningfully expand" on his promised commitments, and PC Gamer Rich Stanton described it as a "statement you expect from a producer who doesn't want to take any position that will threaten valuable industry relationships". Stanton and Bloomberg News Jason Schreier identified the hypocrisy of following up Keighley's statement with the announcement of a game by Quantic Dream, a studio accused of a hostile workplace culture of racism, sexism, and misconduct. Keighley stated he wanted to ensure that spreading a message was balanced with the show's upbeat nature; he said using its platform to reprimand poor behavior is "always something worth thinking about, but it's not a referendum on the industry".

Announcements 
According to Keighley, the show featured around 50 games, with new announcements "probably in the double digits"; he later claimed there would be six major reveals and several film trailers. He said it was a busy year for announcement pitches, noting the show's popularity and accessibility meant more developers and publishers sought involvement. Keighley claimed some studios had specific requests for the placement of their announcements within the show, but he decided about a month prior to allow for all submissions. He felt some of the game announcements were taking advantage of the new generation of consoles for the first time. Keighley noted the show would attempt to include related media, including television shows and films; the first full trailers for the television series Halo and film Sonic the Hedgehog 2 premiered during the show. Keighley described the show as "half an awards show and half a look into the future". Announcements on released and upcoming games were made for:

 A Plague Tale: Requiem
 Babylon's Fall
 Chivalry II
 Cuphead: The Delicious Last Course
 Destiny 2: The Witch Queen
 Evil West
 Fall Guys
 Final Fantasy VII Remake Intergrade
 Forspoken
 Genshin Impact
 Homeworld 3
 Horizon Forbidden West
 The King of Fighters XV
 Lost Ark
 The Matrix Awakens
 Monster Hunter Rise
 Persona 4 Arena Ultimax
 Planet of Lana
 Senua's Saga: Hellblade II
 Somerville
 Suicide Squad: Kill the Justice League
 Tchia
 Tunic
 Warhammer: Vermintide 2

New games announced during the ceremony included:

 Alan Wake II
 Among Us VR
 Arc Raiders
 Dune: Spice Wars
 The Expanse: A Telltale Series
 Have a Nice Death
 Nightingale
 Rumbleverse
 Slitterhead
 Sonic Frontiers
 Star Trek: Resurgence
 Star Wars Eclipse
 The Texas Chainsaw Massacre
 Thirsty Suitors
 Warhammer 40,000: Space Marine 2
 Wonder Woman

Winners and nominees 
Nominees were announced on November 16, 2021. Any game released for public consumption on or before November 19, 2021 was eligible for consideration. The nominees were compiled by a jury panel composed of members from 103 media outlets globally. Winners were determined between the jury (90 percent) and public voting (10 percent); the latter was held via the official website and on social media platforms such as Facebook, Twitter, and Bilibili until December 8. The exception is the Players' Voice award, fully nominated and voted-on by the public; the winner was announced on December 8 after three rounds of voting. Specialized juries decided the nominees and winners for categories such as accessibility and esports. Voting for the best esports team category was also held through the show's Discord server and through direct messages on Twitter. More than 23.2 million votes were submitted on the official website, a 27 percent increase over the previous year.

Keighley found his ownership of the show led to him receiving blame for snubs in nominations, despite not being involved in the voting process. Regarding potential winners, Keighley felt "it's kind of anyone's game this year" but, as the show's producer, he prefers shows like The Game Awards 2018 with the rivalry between God of War and Red Dead Redemption 2. He noted future shows could see the addition of awards for adaptations and user-generated content, but felt "there's just not enough yet".

Awards 
Winners are listed first, highlighted in boldface, and indicated with a double dagger.

Video games

Esports and creators

Games with multiple nominations and awards

Multiple nominations 

Deathloop received the most nominations with nine. Other games with multiple nominations included It Takes Two and Ratchet & Clank: Rift Apart with six, and Psychonauts 2 and Resident Evil Village with five. Xbox Game Studios led the publishers with thirteen nominations, followed by Sony Interactive Entertainment and Electronic Arts with eleven, and Bethesda Softworks and Square Enix with ten.

Multiple awards 
Forza Horizon 5 and It Takes Two led the show with three wins each, followed by Deathloop, Final Fantasy XIV, and Kena: Bridge of Spirits with two awards each. Square Enix and Xbox Game Studios won a total of five awards each, while Electronic Arts won three.

Presenters and performers

Presenters 
The following individuals, listed in order of appearance, presented awards or introduced trailers. All other awards were presented by Keighley or Goodman.

Performers 

The following individuals or groups performed musical numbers. All performances were backed by the Game Awards Orchestra, conducted by Lorne Balfe.

Ratings and reception

Nominees 
Some journalists felt Forza Horizon 5 and Returnal were snubbed in the nominations for the show's Game of the Year category. Den of Geek Matthew Byrd criticized the absence of nominations for The Forgotten City in Best Narrative, Hitman 3 in Best Action/Adventure Game, and Unpacking in Best Independent Game, and felt Cyberpunk 2077 Best Role-Playing Game and Far Cry 6 Best Action Game nominations were undeserved. Game Rants John Higgs similarly considered Unpacking among the biggest snubs. TheGamers Josh Coulson felt The Forgotten City, Lost Judgment, and MLB The Show 21 were unrecognized, and Keanu Reeves deserved a nomination for his role as Johnny Silverhand in Cyberpunk 2077. Rachel Kaser of VentureBeat praised the diversity of the Best Performance nominees.

Ceremony 
The show received a mixed reception from media publications. Push Square Liam Croft enjoyed the new announcements, noting they continued to improve each year. BBC's Steffan Powell considered the announcement of Wonder Woman the biggest surprise, and Kotaku Ari Notis found Have a Nice Death to be among the best reveals. VentureBeat Dean Takahashi praised the announcements, describing The Matrix Awakens as "one of the most inspiring demos of the show", and felt the winners were well-deserved and focused on "innovation and gameplay over brands"; he noted the show proved the mainstream success of the video game industry with presenters and performers like Reeves, Liu, Sting, and Imagine Dragons. Kellen Browning of The New York Times called the show "a victory lap of sorts for the video game community", identifying its crossover with other entertainment mediums.

Schreier of Bloomberg News described the show as "an exhausting experience" after 2020's virtual ceremony, and heard in-person audience members complaining about the "non-stop barrage of trailers" and the show's length. From The Washington Post, Nathan Grayson claimed the crowd stopped paying attention towards the end of the show, and Shannon Liao said some were leaving the venue at least ten minutes before the conclusion; Grayson described some of the presenters' speeches as "jokey, canned", and felt the show was missing "unexpected live moments that capture everybody's attention" like previous ceremonies. Eurogamers Wesley Yin-Poole echoed the latter sentiment, and wrote "the awards part of The Game Awards felt rushed". Todd Marten of the Los Angeles Times similarly felt the ceremony spent more time on announcements than awards, ​and criticized the lack of activism compared to the backlash of other awards shows like the Academy Awards and Golden Globes; he enjoyed the Halo television series preview and the performances of Imagine Dragons and Sting, but lambasted Doug Bowser's Metroid Dread acceptance speech as "hit-the-snooze-button marketing talking points". PC Gamer Stanton felt the show needed to halve its length and focus solely on announcements to become "the true digital E3". Gavin Lane of Nintendo Life disliked that, despite the show's length, several awards were presented during the preshow.

Viewership 
Over 85 million livestreams were used to view the ceremony, the most in the show's history to date. On Twitch, the show received a total of 3.35 million viewers, including co-streams from participating channels, and performance on the show's official YouTube channel increased by 14 percent over the previous year, with more than 1.75 million hours watched. On Twitter, 1.6 million tweets were made about the event—the most in the show's history—and it topped the trends for the eighth year in a row, with a peak of 11 of the top 30 trends related to the show.

Notes

References

External links 
 

The Game Awards ceremonies
2021 awards in the United States
2021 in video gaming
2021 video game awards
December 2021 events in the United States